The following is a list of the busiest airports in Morocco.

Morocco's busiest airports by passenger traffic

Overview

2019

2018

2017

2016

2013

References

Morocco
 
Airports, busiest